A by-election for the seat of Enfield in the South Australian House of Assembly was held on 9 February 2019. The by-election was triggered by the parliamentary resignation of Labor Party MP and former Deputy Premier John Rau on 17 December 2018. Labor candidate Andrea Michaels retained the seat with an increased margin.

A Cheltenham by-election was held on the same day, as Rau's former leader and Premier, Jay Weatherill, had also resigned from parliament.

Dates

Candidates

The Liberal Party declined to field a candidate for both the Enfield and Cheltenham by-elections.

Result

See also
2019 Cheltenham state by-election
List of South Australian House of Assembly by-elections

References

External links
2019 Enfield by-election guide: Antony Green ABC
2019 Enfield by-election guide: Tally Room

South Australian state by-elections
2019 elections in Australia
February 2019 events in Australia